Jeļena Prokopčuka (née Čelnova; born 21 September 1976 in Riga, Latvia) is a retired Latvian long-distance runner, best known for winning the New York City Marathon in 2005 and 2006.

Biography
She holds six outdoor and one indoor Latvian record, ranging from 3000 metres to the marathon distance. Her husband, Aleksandrs Prokopčuks, holds the men's Latvian marathon record with 2:15:56 hours. She is a three-time participant at the Summer Olympics, having represented Latvia in track events in 1996, 2000 and 2004.

Prokopčuka won the 2001 Tallinn Marathon. She won the Paris Half Marathon in 2002, 2003  and 2009. She was the 2003 champion at the World Military Cross Country Championships. She won the Great Edinburgh Run three times consecutively from 2005 to 2007. She is also a five-time winner of the Kuldīga Half Marathon, and a two-time winner of the Almond Blossom Cross Country. Elsewhere, she won the 2002 20 Kilomètres de Paris, the Osaka International Ladies Marathon in 2005 (where she ran her national record time of 2:22:56 hours), and the San Silvestre Vallecana in 2006.

She was the top-performing European at the 2012 Lisbon Half Marathon, coming fifth overall. She was tenth at the 2012 London Marathon and won the Riga Half Marathon. She surprised at the Great North Run, leading out the elite women, and although she fell to fourth she ran a national record of 68:09 minutes. Her final outing of the year came at the Yokohama Marathon, where her season's best time of 2:26:55 hours brought her fourth place.

A strong finish at the 2013 Nagoya Marathon saw her climb from 16th to fourth and record a time of 2:25:46 hours – her fastest in six years. She was runner-up to Tirunesh Dibaba at the Great Manchester Run in May.

Achievements

References

External links

 
 
 

1976 births
Living people
Latvian female long-distance runners
Latvian female marathon runners
Athletes (track and field) at the 1996 Summer Olympics
Athletes (track and field) at the 2000 Summer Olympics
Athletes (track and field) at the 2004 Summer Olympics
Athletes (track and field) at the 2016 Summer Olympics
Olympic athletes of Latvia
Athletes from Riga
New York City Marathon female winners
Latvian Academy of Sport Education alumni
Latvian female cross country runners